Omid-e-Iran OITN is an American television network, inaugurated in 1995. The original mission was to broadcast television content and news to the Iranian American community of Southern California, however the scope broadened to the international Iranian community. The network was founded by Nader Rafiee, who started their journalist career on IRTV. Omid-e-Iran has programming in English and Persian languages.

See also 

 List of Persian-language television channels

References

External links
 

Television stations in California
Persian-language television stations
Television channels and stations established in 1995